Galium circaezans, common name licorice bedstraw or wild licorice, is a plant species in the family Rubiaceae. It is native to the eastern half of the United States from the Great Plains to the Atlantic, plus Quebec and Ontario. There are also a few isolated populations in Washington state, probably adventive.

References

External links
 
 
 Kansas Native Plants,  Forest Bedstraw 
 Name That Plant, Native and Naturalized Plants of the Carolinas and Georgia
 Delaware Wildflowers, southern forest bedstraw

circaezans
Flora of Quebec
Flora of Ontario
Flora of the United States
Plants described in 1803
Flora without expected TNC conservation status